William Kiplagat (born June 21, 1972) is a long-distance runner from Kenya. He ran his personal best of 2:06:50 hours in the 1999 Amsterdam Marathon.

He finished eighth at the 2007 World Championships. He won the Portugal Half Marathon in 2004. In 2009 he finished third in the Frankfurt Marathon with a fast time (2:07:05 hours), even though he was quoted as saying he is now more like a coach than a runner.

He is an uncle to Florence Kiplagat, another Kenyan international level runner.

Achievements
All results regarding marathon, unless stated otherwise

References

External links

marathoninfo

1972 births
Living people
Kenyan male long-distance runners
Place of birth missing (living people)
Kenyan male marathon runners